Fort Juniata Crossing, also known as Fort Juniata or simply Juniata Crossing, was a British French and Indian War era fortification located along the Forbes Road.

It was constructed in  the summer of 1758 as part of a string or forts located along the line of supply and communication westward from the British Army's forward base at the frontier settlement of Carlisle as General Forbes’ army pushed westward toward the French garrison at Fort Duquesne.

Located about halfway between the British fortifications at Fort Littleton to the east and Fort Bedford to the west, Fort Juniata Crossing protected a vital ford across the Raystown Branch of the Juniata River. As the Juniata was the only major river ford along the road between Carlisle and Fort Duquesne, the site was of particular strategic importance.

Smaller and with a smaller garrison than larger forts such as Fort Bedford and Fort Ligonier, Fort Juniata Crossing consisted of fortified storehouses on each side of the river along with a main stockade on the west side of the river. The stockade was a log star shaped fort with five bastions enclosing an area of about 1.7 acres (6,900 square meters).

Colonel Henry Bouquet, General Forbes' principle lieutenant on the campaign, chose the site of the fort.  He wrote..
" The Road from Littleton to Seydeling Hill [sic] is good but the Juniata still has 4 1/2 feet of water. We can ford it in a few days, but as a precaution we will build a bridge. The farther I go away from the settlements the more I see that this expedition, which is believed so easy, is full of almost insurmountable difficulties. "

The fort was of little use to the British Army after the campaign and immediately went into a state of decline. In 1763 Fort Juniata Crossing along with the nearby stockade at Stony Creek were abandoned and the personnel and stores were transferred to Ford Bedford. The road continued to be in use however by army supply wagons to the newly constructed Fort Pitt and later by settlers traveling west. A proper bridge was eventually constructed at the ford for use by road travelers. By 1790 the road was moved to a location near the present site of Route 30 and the bridge and this portion of the roadway fell into disuse. The bridge's stone piers are still visible however. In 1952, the state of Pennsylvania erected a historical marker along Route 30 about 1/2 mile south of the fort's location.

Fort Martin
A Revolutionary War era stockade, named Fort Martin, was constructed on or near the site in the late 1770s. The exact location of the stockade has been lost to history but it is described as being near the "chain bridge" at the site of the former Fort Juniata Crossing. It was a small blockhouse structure constructed by local civilians and designed as a haven for local settlers against raids by hostile Native American war parties. It fell into disuse after the war ended and the threat of raids was over.

Juniata
Juniata
Juniata
Juniata